Natalia Levchenkova (born in Smolensk on ) is a  Russian-born Moldovan biathlete.

Levchenkova competed in the 2006 and 2010 Winter Olympics for Moldova. Her best performance was 8th in the 2006 individual. In 2006, she also finished 21st in the mass start, 41st in the sprint and 23rd in the pursuit. In 2010, she also finished 53rd in the sprint, 56th in the pursuit and 37th in the individual.

As of February 2013, her best performance at the Biathlon World Championships is 8th, in the 2008 individual and the 2009 pursuit.

As of February 2013, Levchenkova's best individual performance in Biathlon World Cup races is 7th, achieved twice in mass start races. Her best overall finish in the Biathlon World Cup is 20th, in 2008/09.

References

External links
 

1977 births
Biathletes at the 2006 Winter Olympics
Biathletes at the 2010 Winter Olympics
Moldovan female biathletes
Russian female biathletes
Living people
Olympic biathletes of Moldova
People from Smolensk